is a Japanese footballer who plays for Auckland United FC.

Club statistics
Updated to 24 February 2019.

1Includes Emperor's Cup.
2Includes J. League Cup.
3Includes AFC Champions League.

National team statistics

Honours

Club
  FC Tokyo
J2 League (1) : 2011
Emperor's Cup (1) : 2011

Japan
EAFF East Asian Cup (1) : 2013

References

External links

 
 Japan National Football Team Database
 
 Profile at Sagan Tosu
 

1987 births
Living people
Tokyo Gakugei University alumni
Association football people from Gunma Prefecture
Japanese footballers
Japan international footballers
J1 League players
J2 League players
J3 League players
FC Tokyo players
FC Tokyo U-23 players
Vissel Kobe players
Sagan Tosu players
2013 FIFA Confederations Cup players
Association football midfielders
Universiade bronze medalists for Japan
Universiade medalists in football
Medalists at the 2009 Summer Universiade
Presidents of the Japan Pro-Footballers Association